There have been two baronetcies created for members of the Lyell family, both in the Baronetage of the United Kingdom. Both creations are extinct.

The Lyell Baronetcy, of Kinnordy in the County of Forfar, was created in the Baronetage of the United Kingdom on 22 August 1864 for the prominent Scottish geologist Charles Lyell. The title became extinct on his death in 1875.

The Lyell Baronetcy, of Kinnordy in the County of Forfar, was created in the Baronetage of the United Kingdom on 1 January 1894 for the Scottish Liberal politician Leonard Lyell. He was the nephew of the first Baronet of the 1864 creation. Lyell was later elevated to the peerage as Baron Lyell. The baronetcy became extinct along with the barony in 2017.

Lyell baronets, of Kinnordy (1864)
Sir Charles Lyell, 1st Baronet (14 November 1797 – 22 February 1875)

Lyell baronets, of Kinnordy (1894)
see the Baron Lyell

Notes

References

Kidd, Charles, Williamson, David (editors). Debrett's Peerage and Baronetage (1990 edition). New York: St Martin's Press, 1990, 

Extinct baronetcies in the Baronetage of the United Kingdom